Eroschematini is a tribe of beetles in the subfamily Cerambycinae.

Genera
 Chaodalis Pascoe, 1865
 Eroschema Pascoe, 1859
 Tethlimmena Bates, 1872

Selected species

 Tethlimmena aliena Bates, 1872
 Tethlimmena basalis Gahan, 1895
 Tethlimmena gahani Gounelle, 1911

References

Cerambycinae
Beetle tribes